Mukutan is a settlement in Kenya's Baringo County. A tourist cabin in Mukutan is featured in a Tripadvisor link.

References 

Populated places in Baringo County